No income, no asset (NINA) is a term used in the United States mortgage industry to describe one of many documentation types which lenders may allow when underwriting a mortgage. A loan issued under such circumstances may be referred to as a NINA loan or NINJA loan.

NINA programs are ostensibly created for those with hard to verify incomes (waiters, etc.) but in actuality have been popularly used in situations where aggressive mortgage lenders and brokers did not want any trouble qualifying otherwise non-qualifying loans, thus becoming a significant factor in the subprime lending crisis. A significant number of NINA loans were never possible for the applicant to repay and have resulted in defaults for this reason, as laid out in detail by investigative reporters, including the reporting of This American Life and Planet Money that culminated in the Peabody- and Polk- award winning episode "The Giant Pool of Money."

No income, no job, no assets ("NINJA")

A NINJA loan is a nickname for very low-quality subprime loans. It was a play on NINA, which in turn is based on the notation scheme for the level of documentation the mortgage originator required. It was described as a no income, no job, [and] no assets loan because the only thing an applicant had to show was his/her credit rating, which was presumed to reflect willingness and ability to pay. The term was popularized by Charles R. Morris in his 2008 book The Two Trillion Dollar Meltdown, though the acronym had been publicly used by some subprime mortgage lenders for some years.  They were especially prominent during the United States housing bubble circa 2003-2007 but have gained wider notoriety due to the subprime mortgage crisis in July/August 2007 as a prime example of poor lending practices. The term grew in usage during the 2008 financial crisis as the sub prime mortgage crisis was blamed on such loans. It works on two levels – as an acronym; and allusion to the fact that NINJA loans are often defaulted on, with the borrower disappearing like a ninja.

The term was also popularized in the 2010 US film Wall Street: Money Never Sleeps by the character Gordon Gekko played by Michael Douglas.

See also
Adjustable rate mortgage
Balloon payment mortgage
No doc loan

References

External links

No Money Down' Falls Flat", Washington Post
Why Did So Many People Make So Many Ex Post Bad Decisions? The Causes of the Foreclosure Crisis, Working Paper 2012-7, May 2012, prepared for the conference "Rethinking Finance: New Perspectives on the Crisis"; Christopher L. Foote, Kristopher S. Gerardi, and Paul S. Willen

Mortgage industry of the United States
United States housing bubble